AVZ may refer to:

 Austral Volcanic Zone, a volcanic arc in the Andes Mountains
 AVZ, the airline code of Spanish airline Air Valencia
 AVZ Antiviral Toolkit, anti-virus software